Ahmad Balkis (born 14 January 1961) is a Syrian athlete. He competed in the men's high jump at the 1980 Summer Olympics.

References

1961 births
Living people
Athletes (track and field) at the 1980 Summer Olympics
Syrian male high jumpers
Olympic athletes of Syria
Place of birth missing (living people)
20th-century Syrian people